Matthew Francis Cogan (born 15 June 1944), known as Frank Cogan, is an Irish former Gaelic football coach and player. At club level he played with Nemo Rangers and was a member of and later coached the Cork senior football team. Cogan usually lined out as a defender.

Playing career

Cogan first came to Gaelic football prominence as a schoolboy at Coláiste Chríost Rí before later winning a Sigerson Cup title with University College Cork in 1966. He had earlier won the first of seven County Championship medals with the college; the other six were claimed with the Nemo Rangers club, with whom he also won three All-Ireland Club Championship titles. Cogan first appeared on the inter-county scene as a member of the Cork minor team that won the county's inaugural All-Ireland Minor Championship title in 1961. He later spent three seasons with the Cork under-21 team and was at centre-back for the 1965 All-Ireland under-21 final defeat by Kildare. Cogan's performances at underage levels saw him drafted onto the Cork senior football team and he made his debut against Dublin during the 1965-66 league. He was a mainstay on the team for much of the following decade and was at left corner-back for Cork's 1973 All-Ireland Championship success. Cogan's other honours include five Munster Championship medals and a Railway Cup title with Munster, however, a serious leg injury brought his inter-county career to an end in 1974.

Coaching career

Cogan first became involved in coaching at various levels with the Nemo Rangers club. At inter-county level he coached the Cork minor team to an All-Ireland final defeat by Galway in 1976. Cogan subsequently took charge of the coaching duties with the Cork senior team, guiding the team to a league final defeat by Roscommon in 1979. He became a close coaching associate of Billy Morgan and was defensive coach and assistant team masseur when the Cork senior team won two All-Ireland Championship titles from four consecutive finals appearances between 1987 and 1990.

Personal life

Cogan's grandfather, Matt Gargan, won five All-Ireland Championships with the Kilkenny senior hurling team in a seven-season spell from 1907 to 1913. His uncle, Jack Gargan, also claimed All-Ireland honours as part of the Kilkenny team that beat Cork in the 1939 All-Ireland final. Cogan's brother-in-law, Billy Morgan, was a teammate at club and inter-county levels, while another brother-in-law, Ray Cummins, captained the Cork senior hurling team.

Honours

Player

University College Cork
Sigerson Cup: 1966
Cork Senior Football Championship: 1964

Nemo Rangers
All-Ireland Senior Club Football Championship: 1973, 1979, 1982
Munster Senior Club Football Championship: 1972, 1974, 1975 (c), 1978, 1981
Cork Senior Football Championship: 1972, 1974, 1975 (c), 1977, 1978, 1981
Cork Intermediate Hurling Championship: 1971 (c)

Cork
All-Ireland Senior Football Championship: 1973
Munster Senior Football Championship: 1966, 1967, 1971, 1973, 1974
Munster Under-21 Football Championship: 1965
All-Ireland Minor Football Championship: 1961
Munster Minor Football Championship: 1961

Munster
Railway Cup: 1972

Coach

Cork
Munster Minor Football Championship: 1976, 1977

References

1944 births
Living people
UCC Gaelic footballers
Nemo Rangers Gaelic footballers
Cork inter-county Gaelic footballers
Munster inter-provincial Gaelic footballers
Gaelic football managers
Gaelic football selectors